Allen Hardy (1873–1950) was an English footballer who played in the Football League for Blackburn Rovers.

References

1873 births
1950 deaths
English footballers
Association football defenders
English Football League players
Wigan County F.C. players
Blackburn Rovers F.C. players
Ilkeston Town F.C. (1880s) players